St. Teresa is an unincorporated community in Franklin County, Florida, United States. It is located along U.S. Route 98, on St. James Island and the Gulf of Mexico.

References

External links
Saint Teresa, Florida (Florida HomeTown Locator)

Unincorporated communities in Franklin County, Florida
Beaches of Franklin County, Florida
Unincorporated communities in Florida
Populated coastal places in Florida on the Gulf of Mexico
Beaches of Florida